Olaf of Norway – Norwegian: Olav - may refer to:
Olaf Haraldsson Geirstadalf, reputed son of Harald Fairhair 
Olaf I of Norway, Olaf Tryggvason, (reigned 995–1000)
Olaf II of Norway, Olaf the Saint, (reigned 1015–1028)
Olaf III of Norway, Olaf Kyrre, (reigned 1067–1093)
Olaf Magnusson of Norway,  (reigned 1103–1115)
Olav Ugjæva (died 1169), anti-king against Magnus V of Norway
Olaf IV of Norway, Olaf Haakonsson, also Olaf II of Denmark, (reigned 1380–1387)
Olaf V of Norway, (reigned 1957–1991)